The 2013–14 Duke Blue Devils men's basketball team represented Duke University during the 2013–14 NCAA Division I men's basketball season. They were led by thirty-fourth year and Hall of Fame head coach Mike Krzyzewski. They played its home games at Cameron Indoor Stadium in Durham, North Carolina as members of the Atlantic Coast Conference. They finished the season 26–9, 13–5 in ACC play to finish in a tie for third place. They advanced to the championship game of the ACC tournament where they lost to Virginia. They received an at-large bid to the NCAA tournament where they lost in the second round to Mercer.

Previous season
In November, The Blue Devils won the Battle 4 Atlantis tournament in the Bahamas, defeating Louisville in the championship game. The Blue Devils posted four victories against top 5 opponents (at the time of the game) and were undefeated (16-0) at home. Completing the season with 30 wins (and 6 losses; 14–4 in ACC play), Duke finished in second place in the ACC regular season standings. Duke was ranked in the top 10 of the AP poll all season long, including five weeks at #1. They lost in the quarterfinals of the ACC tournament to Maryland and subsequently received a two seed in the 2013 NCAA tournament. They defeated Albany in the Round of 64, #22 Creighton in the Round of 32, and #9 Michigan State in the Sweet Sixteen to reach the Elite Eight. Duke lost to #1 overall seed and eventual NCAA champion Louisville in the Elite Eight in Indianapolis who reversed the game result from the meeting earlier in the season.

Off season

Departures

Class of 2013 signees

Roster

Schedule
In Duke's 2013–14 ACC season opening 79–77 loss against Notre Dame, Krzyzewski endured his 1st loss to one of his former assistant coaches after 18 wins. With the loss, Duke fell from the top 10 in the AP Poll for the first time in 122 weeks of the poll (since November 26, 2007). On January 25, Duke defeated Florida State to achieve Krzyzewski's 900th win at Duke. The Blue Devils were upset by Mercer, 78–71 in the NCAA tournament's 2nd round, to conclude their season.

|-
!colspan=12 style="background:#00009C; color:#FFFFFF;"| Exhibition

|-
!colspan=12 style="background:#00009C; color:#FFFFFF;"| Non-conference regular season

|-
!colspan=12 style="background:#00009C; color:#FFFFFF;"| ACC regular season
|-

|-
!colspan=12 style="background:#00009C; color:#FFFFFF;"| ACC Tournament

|-
!colspan=12 style="background:#00009C; color:#FFFFFF;"| NCAA tournament

Rankings

*AP does not release post-NCAA tournament rankings

References

Duke Blue Devils
Duke Blue Devils men's basketball seasons
Duke
Duke
Duke